Michelle Greenidge is a British actress. She is known for her roles as Valerie in the Netflix black-comedy drama series After Life, Lola Okonedo Akimbo in the BBC Two comedy Mandy, PC Williams in the police comedy drama Code 404 and Rosa Babatunde in the Channel 4 television drama It's a Sin.

Career 
Greenidge began her acting career in 2009 in the short film Leave, where she played the role of Claire. Her next role came in 2013 as the mother in the short film Sorry We Don't Help Darkies. In 2014, she portrayed Auntie Jeanie in an episode of the comedy series All About the McKenzies and the same year went on to appear in various short films, Crude, Samuell Benta's Perceptions and Daddy's Girl. In 2015, she played Councillor Gretel in four episodes of the Sky Living comedy drama Venus vs. Mars. Greenidge's first film role came in 2016 when she appeared as Ms. Vincent in the crime-thriller film The Intent. She reprised the role for the sequel The Intent 2: The Come Up in 2018.

In 2019, Greenidge began portraying the role of receptionist Valerie in the Netflix black-comedy drama After Life. She appeared in all three series of show. Since 2020, she has starred in Diane Morgan's BBC Two comedy Mandy as Lola Okonedo Akimbo, nail technician and best friend to the titular character. Between 2020 and 2021, she played PC Williams in the police comedy drama Code 404. She also played Mrs. Manning in Mangrove, the first film in the anthology series Small Axe. In 2021, she played Rosa Babatunde in the Channel 4 drama It's a Sin.

Greenidge has also had minor and guest roles in Doctors, Casualty, Timewasters and King Gary. She has also worked in theatre with some of her credits including Ear for Eye, At the Feet of Jesus, Super Skinny Bitches, House, All Saints, Stopcock, Do You Pray?, The Distance Between Us, People Who Need People, The House They Grew Up In and Omega Time.

On 20 January 2023, it was announced that Greenidge would be guest starring in the fourteenth series of Doctor Who. Her casting was announced alongside Anita Dobson.

Filmography

References

External links

21st-century British actresses
Black British actresses
British film actresses
British soap opera actresses
British stage actresses
British television actresses
Living people
Year of birth missing (living people)